Jay Kesler is the former president, Chancellor and current President Emeritus of Taylor University in Upland, Indiana. Kesler graduated in 1958 from Taylor University and is notable for his writings and radio work. Most recently, he served as the Preaching Pastor of Upland Community Church, in Upland, Indiana.
Dr. Kesler was President of Youth for Christ from 1973–1985 and President of Taylor University from 1985-2000.
Dr. Kesler is also the author of nearly 30 books.

Publications
The Strong Weak People 
Emotionally Healthy Teenagers 
Family Forum 
Restoring A Loving Marriage 
Grand parenting - The Agony and the Ecstasy 
Challenges for the College Bound 
Being Holy, Being Human. ASIN: B000GSLRMQ

References

Year of birth missing (living people)
Living people
Taylor University alumni
Taylor University faculty